Platygrapha is a genus of lichenized fungi in the family Thelotremataceae.

References

External links
Index Fungorum

Ostropales
Lichen genera
Ostropales genera
Taxa named by Miles Joseph Berkeley